Milmine is an unincorporated community in Cerro Gordo Township, Piatt County, Illinois, United States.

Geography

References

Unincorporated communities in Piatt County, Illinois
Unincorporated communities in Illinois